Edna Butfield   was a British speech and language therapist and the Principal of West End Hospital Speech Therapy Training School, London (latterly part of University College London. She was elected a Fellow of the Royal College of Speech and Language Therapists in 1950 and awarded the annual Honours of the RCSLT in 1982. In 1969 she was made a MBE in the 1969 New Year Honours list.

Publications
Butfield, E., & Zangwill, O. L. 1946. "Re-education in aphasia: A review of 70 cases". Journal of Neurology, Neurosurgery, and Psychiatry, 9(2), 75.
Butfield, E., 1958. "Rehabilitation of the dysphasic patient". Speech Pathology and Therapy, 1, 9–17
Butfield, E. 1960. "Acquired receptive dysphasia". Speech Pathology and Therapy, 3, 8–12.

References

British women academics
Speech and language pathologists
Fellows of the Royal College of Speech and Language Therapists
Members of the Order of the British Empire